Gershwin's World is a studio album by the American jazz pianist Herbie Hancock. Prominent guests include Joni Mitchell, Kathleen Battle, Stevie Wonder, Wayne Shorter and Chick Corea.

It contains songs written by George and Ira Gershwin. It features several prominent musicians, including James Carter, Cyro Baptista, Kenny Garrett, Stanley Clarke, and the Orpheus Chamber Orchestra.

Track listing
"Overture (Fascinating Rhythm)"
"It Ain't Necessarily So"
"The Man I Love" (feat. Joni Mitchell)
"Here Come De Honey Man"
"St. Louis Blues" (feat. Stevie Wonder)
"Lullaby"
"Blueberry Rhyme"
"It Ain't Necessarily So Interlude"
"Cotton Tail"
"Summertime" (feat. Joni Mitchell)
"My Man's Gone Now"
"Prelude In C# Minor"
"Concerto For Piano And Orchestra In G, 2nd Movement" (Maurice Ravel) 
"Embraceable You"

Personnel

 Alex Al– upright bass
 Toby Appel – viola
 Cyro Baptista – percussion
 Kathleen Battle – soprano, vocals
 Ronnie Bauch – violin
 Martha Caplin –  concert master, violin
 Terri Lyne Carrington – drums, production assistant
 James Carter – soprano saxophone, tenor saxophone
 Susannah Chapman – cello
 Catherine Cho – violin
 Sarah Clarke – principal viola
 Stanley Clarke – bass
 Ira Coleman – bass, production assistant
 Chick Corea – piano
 Charles Curtis – cello
 Nicolas Danielson – violin
 Marji Danilow – bass
 Madou Dembelle – djembe
 Matthew Dine – English horn
 Massamba Diop – talking drum
 Karen Dreyfus – viola
 Jennifer Frautschi – violin
 Kenny Garrett – alto saxophone
 Marlon Graves – guitar, mixing, percussion
 Michael Finn – principal bassoon
 Brian Greene – oboe
 Bireyma Guiye – percussion
 Herbie Hancock – arranger, liner notes, organ, piano
 Eddie Henderson – flugelhorn, trumpet
 Cynde Iverson – bassoon
 Gene Jackson – drums
 Joanna Jenner – violin
 Renee Jolles – violin  Eastman School of Music
 Chris Komer – horn
 Bakithi Kumalo – bass, guitar
 Elizabeth Mann – flute
 Cheik Mbaye – percussion
 Melissa Meel – cello
 Joni Mitchell – vocals
 Katherine Murdock – viola
 Charles Neidich – clarinet, E flat clarinet
 Ahling Neu – viola
 Donald Palma – principal bass
 Ellen Payne – violin
 Todd Phillips – violin
 Nardo Poy – viola
 William Purvis – principal horn
 Richard Rood – violin
 Eriko Sato – principal violin
 Wayne Shorter – soprano saxophone, tenor saxophone
 David Singer – clarinet
 Mina Smith – cello
 Clavin Wiersman – violin
 Peter Winograd – violin
 Stevie Wonder – arranger, harmonica, vocals
 Asmira Woodward-Page – violin
 Eric Wyrick – violin
 Naoko Tanaka – violin

Production

 David Charles Abell – consultant
 Robi Banerji – assistant engineer
 Istvan Banyai – artwork, illustrations
 Thom Cadley – assistant engineer
 Dave Darlington – engineer
 Rob Eaton – audio engineer, engineer
 Steve Genewick – assistant
 Clark Germain – audio engineer, engineer
 Fred Hedemark – assistant engineer
 Pete Karam – assistant engineer
 Jimmy Katz – photography, session photographer
 Theodora Kuslan – release coordinator
 Ron Martinez – assistant engineer
 Andreas Meyer – digital editing
 James Minchin – cover photo, photography
 Pedro Moreira – assistant, music assistant
 Melinda Murphy – production coordination
 Orpheus Chamber Orchestra 	
 Darcy Proper – digital editing
 Rob Rapley – digital editing, engineer
 Robert Sadin – arranger, audio production, drum programming, liner notes, percussion programming, producer, programming
 Doug Sax – mastering
 Al Schmitt – surround mix
 Bill Airey Smith – digital editing
 Jason Stasium – assistant engineer
 Brett Swain – assistant engineer
 Rich Breen - tracking engineer (Cottontail)
 Bruce Swedien – mixing
 David Swope – assistant engineer
 Kayo Teramoto – assistant engineer
 Camille Tominaro – production coordination
 Tom Truslow – production coordination
 Brian Vibberts – mixing
 Todd Whitelock – audio engineer, engineer
 Mark Wilder – mastering
 Robert Zuckerman – session photographer

References 

1998 albums
George and Ira Gershwin tribute albums
Herbie Hancock albums
Verve Records albums
Grammy Award for Best Jazz Instrumental Album